Thai Ban is a tambon (sub-district) in Mueang Samut Prakan District, Samut Prakan Province.

Toponymy
Its name "Thai Ban" literally translates to "the end of the muban (village)". Because during the reign of King Chulalongkorn (Rama V), it was considered a very distant area from the downtown Samut Prakan, also colloquially known as Pak Nam. At that time it was called "Thai Ban Talat" (the end of the marketplace), later called "Thai Ban" for short.

Geography
Adjacent areas are, clockwise from north, Pak Nam, Thai Ban Mai, Bang Pu Mai, all of them are in its district, and Laem Fa Pha in Phra Samut Chedi District (across Chao Phraya River). It borders Bay of Bangkok (upper Gulf of Thailand) to the south.

Administration

Central administration
The entire area is under the administration of Bang Pu Sub-District Municipality.

Local administration
Thai Ban is divided into seven administrative villages.

Population
As of April 30, 2022, it had a total population of 24,350 people (11,866 males, 12,484 females) in 11,415 households.

Places
Wat Asokaram
Wat Rat Pho Thong
Wat Thong Kong
Hadamara Aksornlak Wittaya School 
Taurak Kindergarten
Thai Ban Health Promoting Hospital
Ammara Beach Roundabout

Neighbouring places
Bang Pu Recreation Center
Bangpoo Industrial Estate
Kheha BTS Station (E23)

References

Tambon of Samut Prakan Province
Populated places on the Chao Phraya River